Sociedad Deportiva Octavio Vigo is a Spanish handball club based in Vigo, Galicia. The team plays in División de Plata after being relegated from Liga ASOBAL.

Season by season

13 seasons in Liga ASOBAL

Notable players
 Nikola Prce
 Ivan Čupić
 Edhem Sirćo
 Darko Martinović
 Xavier Pascual Fuertes

Stadium information
Name: - As Travesas
City: - Vigo
Capacity: - 4,500 people
Address: - Avd. Castrelos, 1

External links
Official website

Spanish handball clubs
Sport in Vigo
Handball clubs established in 1966
Sports teams in Galicia (Spain)